In enzymology, a formyl-CoA transferase is an enzyme that catalyzes the chemical reaction

formyl-CoA + oxalate  formate + oxalyl-CoA

Thus, the two substrates of this enzyme are formyl-CoA and oxalate, whereas its two products are formate and oxalyl-CoA.

This enzyme belongs to the family of transferases, specifically the CoA-transferases.  The systematic name of this enzyme class is formyl-CoA:oxalate CoA-transferase. Other names in common use include formyl-coenzyme A transferase, and formyl-CoA oxalate CoA-transferase.

Structural studies

References

 
 

EC 2.8.3
Enzymes of known structure